Air is a French music duo from Versailles, consisting of Nicolas Godin and Jean-Benoît Dunckel. Their critically acclaimed debut album, Moon Safari, including the track "Sexy Boy", was an international success in 1998.  Its follow-up, The Virgin Suicides, was the score to Sofia Coppola's first movie of the same name. The band has since released the albums 10 000 Hz Legend, Talkie Walkie, Pocket Symphony, Love 2, Le voyage dans la lune and Music for Museum. The band is influenced by a wide variety of musical styles and artists.

History

Formation 
Nicolas Godin studied architecture at the École nationale supérieure d'architecture de Versailles, and Jean-Benoît Dunckel studied mathematics, before forming a band in 1995. Before founding Air, Dunckel and Godin played together in the band Orange with others such as Alex Gopher, Xavier Jamaux and Jean de Reydellet. The former two subsequently contributed to remixes of tracks recorded by Air.

Initially Godin worked alone, recording a demo with members of Funkadelic as his backing band before releasing his first entirely solo effort, "Modular Mix", which featured production by Étienne de Crécy.

Career 
After making several remixes for other acts in the first half of the 1990s, Air recorded its first EP, Premiers Symptômes, in 1995. The band released its first album, Moon Safari, in 1998. Its first single, "Sexy Boy", was heavily played on alternative radio stations. The album received universal acclaim and became an international success. In 1999, Air composed the score The Virgin Suicides to Sofia Coppola's debut film of the same name; in 2012, Air wrote its second score to Georges Méliès' Le Voyage Dans La Lune. In the 2000s, Dunckel and Godin released four studio albums, including 10 000 Hz Legend (2001), Talkie Walkie (2004), Pocket Symphony (2007), and Love 2 (2009).

Other works 
Air has often collaborated with Coppola. Air drummer and former Redd Kross member Brian Reitzell put together the soundtrack to 2003's Lost in Translation, including one original contribution by Air titled "Alone in Kyoto". The soundtrack for Coppola's October 2006 film Marie Antoinette featured a track by Air ("Il Secondo Giorno"). Air wrote and played the music of the album 5:55 by Anglo-French actress and singer Charlotte Gainsbourg, which was released in August 2006. Air has recorded a DJ mix album, Late Night Tales: Air, for Azuli Records' Late Night Tales series. The release was initially scheduled for October 2005, but was delayed several times. It finally was released, complete with a new sleeve design, in September 2006. Darkel, a solo album by Dunckel, was released that same year.

City Reading (Tre Storie Western) (2003) started as an idea for a collaboration with contemporary Italian writer Alessandro Baricco, known for his unusual characterizations and lyrical, poetic style. Baricco contacted Air in summer 2002 with the idea to marry narration of texts from his book City with live original musical accompaniment. The performance premiered live in November 2002 at Rome's Teatro Valle and was deemed such a success that both parties resolved to make a full studio recording.

Influences and musical style 
Air is associated with a variety of musical styles: electronica, space pop, dream pop, progressive rock, downtempo, chillout, trip hop, ambient, electronic pop and space rock. Dunckel grew up listening to both classical and electronic music, especially Kraftwerk. He later took an interest in what he called the "English dark rock" of Siouxsie and the Banshees and Joy Division, while being a fan of David Bowie, Iggy Pop and Lou Reed. Brian Eno and Cluster were two of the electronic acts who inspired him the most. He cites among his favorite artists: Maurice Ravel for classical music, François de Roubaix for music soundtracks and Siouxsie and the Banshees for pop music. Dunckel shared with Godin a special liking for the music of Michel Legrand, Philip Glass and Grace Jones. During his childhood, Godin was fascinated by the Beatles before later discovering the soul of Sly and the Family Stone. The duo were influenced by progressive rock pioneers Pink Floyd.

Air uses many of its studio instruments (like Moog synthesizers, the Korg MS-20, Wurlitzer and Vocoder) on stage, where their ability to improvise is more clearly highlighted. The band performs the well-known tracks from the albums live as extended or altered versions. Air often collaborates (both in the studio and live) with artists like Beth Hirsch (Moon Safari), Françoise Hardy ("Jeanne"), Jean-Jacques Perrey ("Cosmic Bird"), Gordon Tracks ("Playground Love" and "Easy Going Woman" – Gordon Tracks is a pseudonym of the French singer Thomas Mars from Phoenix), Beck (10 000 Hz Legend) and Jean-Michel Jarre ("Close Your Eyes" from Jarre's Electronica 1: The Time Machine). They also invited Dave Palmer on their 2004 tour and drummer Earl Harvin, Vincent Taurelle and Steve Jones on their 2007 tour.

AIR as an acronym 
The band has given conflicting information about whether AIR is an acronym. In a clip aired in 2022, Godin told the BBC, “AIR is a acronym. I don't know if you have the same word in English, but it's, uh, ‘amour, imagination, and rêve’.” Dunckel apparently said the same thing, as the interview cuts to a separately filmed portion where Dunckel says “...which means ‘love, imagination, and dreaming’.”

However, in a 1998 interview for Australian magazine Rave, Godin reportedly denied the claim, saying “No. Someone made that up, but it was a really nice thing to do. I wish I could have that idea.”

Discography 

 Moon Safari (1998)
 10 000 Hz Legend (2001)
 Talkie Walkie (2004)
 Pocket Symphony (2007)
 Love 2 (2009)
 Le Voyage Dans La Lune (2012)

Soundtrack albums:
 The Virgin Suicides (2000)
 Music for Museum (2014)

Extended plays:
 Premiers Symptômes (1997)

Collaborative albums:
 City Reading (Tre Storie Western) (2003)

Mix and remix albums:
 Everybody Hertz (2002)
 Late Night Tales (2006)

Compilation albums:
 Twentyears (2016)

Awards 
Air won the award for Best Music Video at the 2011 Byron Bay International Film Festival for the video to "So Light Is Her Footfall".

See also 
 List of ambient music artists

References

External links 

 Official website
 
 
 Discography of early works

1995 establishments in France
Ambient music groups
Astralwerks artists
Dream pop musical groups
Electronic music duos
French electronic music groups
French film score composers
French musical duos
Musical groups established in 1995
French space rock musical groups
Trip hop groups
Chill-out musicians
Downtempo musicians
Musical groups from Île-de-France
Virgin Records artists